"They Stood Up for Love" is a song by alternative rock group Live, which was released as the third and final single from their 1999 album, The Distance to Here. The song was released in the United States on June 26, 2000, and reached number 31 on the Billboard Modern Rock Tracks chart and number 24 on the Mainstream Rock Tracks chart. It also peaked at number 88 in Australia.

The European single releases include acoustic recordings made at Jet Studios in Brussels, Belgium, in April 2000. The acoustic recording of "They Stood Up for Love" was successful in the Flanders region of Belgium, reaching number one for two weeks, and it also reached number 19 in the Netherlands. It was Flanders' fourth-highest-selling single of 2000.

Music video
The video for "They Stood Up for Love" was directed by Kai Sehr and features the band performing the song in a recording studio. This footage is interspersed with film of young people partying. The two strands come together as the people from the increasingly wild party join the band in the studio.

Track listings

Australian CD single
 "They Stood Up for Love" (radio mix)
 "Run to the Water" (acoustic version)
 "The Distance" (acoustic version) – 4:39
 "The Dolphin's Cry" (acoustic version) – 5:15
 "I Alone" (acoustic version) – 4:00
 "They Stood Up for Love" (acoustic version) – 4:17

European CD single 1
 "They Stood Up for Love" (acoustic version, recorded at Jet Studios, Brussels, Belgium) – 4:02
 "They Stood Up for Love" (radio mix) – 4:13

European CD single 2
 "They Stood Up for Love" (radio mix)
 "I Alone" (acoustic version)
 "The Dolphin's Cry" (acoustic version)
 "They Stood Up for Love" (acoustic version)

European maxi-CD single
 "They Stood Up for Love" (radio mix)
 "Run to the Water" (acoustic version)
 "The Distance" (acoustic version)
 "They Stood Up for Love" (acoustic version)

Credits and personnel
Credits are lifted from the US promo CD liner notes and The Distance to Here album booklet.

Studios
 Recorded at The Site (San Rafael, California), Village Recorder (West Los Angeles), A&M Studios (Hollywood, California), and The Plant (Sausalito, California)
 Mixed at South Beach Studios (Miami Beach, Florida) and Encore Studios (Burbank, California)
 Mastered at Sterling Sound (New York City)

Live
 Ed Kowalczyk – writing, vocals, guitar
 Patrick Dahlheimer – writing, bass
 Chad Taylor – writing, lead guitars
 Chad Gracey – drums
 Live – production

Other personnel

 Jerry Harrison – production
 Gary Kurfirst – executive production
 Tom Lord-Alge – mixing
 Karl Derfler – engineering
 Doug McKean – additional engineering
 Ted Jensen – mastering
 David Sestak – management
 Media Five Entertainment – management

Charts

Weekly charts

Year-end charts

Certifications

References

1999 songs
2000 singles
Live (band) songs
Radioactive Records singles
Song recordings produced by Jerry Harrison
Songs written by Chad Taylor (guitarist)
Songs written by Ed Kowalczyk
Songs written by Patrick Dahlheimer
Ultratop 50 Singles (Flanders) number-one singles
Universal Music Australia singles